Ivan Božić may refer to:
 Ivan Božić (footballer, born 1983)
 Ivan Božić (footballer, born 1997)
 Ivan Božić (historian)